Ephysteris montana is a moth in the family Gelechiidae. It was described by H.H.Li and Bidzilya in 2008. It is found in China (Sichuan).

The length of the forewings is 4–5 mm. The forewings are covered with grey, brown-tipped scales, mottled by ochreous along the veins. There are small dark spots about one-third near the costal margin, a distinct black spot surrounded by ochreous scales in the cell and two black spots at one-third and two-thirds near the posterior margin. The hindwings are pale grey. Adults are on wing in mid-July.

Etymology
The species name refers to the species distribution in high mountains and is derived from Latin montanus (meaning mountainous).

References

Ephysteris
Moths described in 2008